The Cliff House Hotel is a luxury hotel in Ardmore, County Waterford, Ireland. The House restaurant is located in the hotel.

References

External links

Hotels in County Waterford
Luxury hotels